Kenneth Tompkins Bainbridge (July 27, 1904 – July 14, 1996) was an American physicist at Harvard University who did work on cyclotron research. His precise measurements of mass differences between nuclear isotopes allowed him to confirm Albert Einstein's mass–energy equivalence concept. He was the Director of the Manhattan Project's Trinity nuclear test, which took place July 16, 1945. Bainbridge described the Trinity explosion as a "foul and awesome display". He remarked to J. Robert Oppenheimer immediately after the test, "Now we are all sons of bitches." This marked the beginning of his dedication to ending the testing of nuclear weapons and to efforts to maintain civilian control of future developments in that field.

Early life
Kenneth Tompkins Bainbridge was born in Cooperstown, New York. He was educated at Horace Mann School in New York. While at high school he developed an interest in ham radio which inspired him to enter Massachusetts Institute of Technology (MIT) in 1921 to study electrical engineering. In five years he earned both Bachelor of Science (S.B.) and Master of Science (S.M.) degrees. During the summer breaks he worked at General Electric's laboratories in Lynn, Massachusetts and Schenectady, New York. While there he obtained three patents related to photoelectric tubes.

Normally this would have been a promising start to a career at General Electric, but it made Bainbridge aware of how interested he was in physics.  Upon graduating from MIT in 1926, he enrolled at Princeton University, where Karl T. Compton, a consultant to General Electric, was on the faculty. In 1929, he was awarded a Ph.D. in his new field, writing his thesis on "A search for element 87 by analysis of positive rays" under the supervision of Henry DeWolf Smyth.

Early career
Bainbridge enjoyed a series of prestigious fellowships after graduation. He was awarded a National Research Council, and then a Bartol Research Foundation fellowship. At the time the Franklin Institute's Bartol Research Foundation was located on the Swarthmore College campus in Pennsylvania, and was directed by W. F. G. Swann, an English physicist with an interest in nuclear physics. Bainbridge married Margaret ("Peg") Pitkin, a member of the Swarthmore teaching faculty, in September 1931. They had a son, Martin Keeler, and two daughters, Joan and Margaret Tomkins.

In 1932, Bainbridge developed a mass spectrometer with a resolving power of 600 and a relative precision of one part in 10,000. He used this instrument to verify Albert Einstein's mass–energy equivalence, E = mc2. Francis William Aston wrote that:

In 1933, Bainbridge was awarded a prestigious Guggenheim Fellowship, which he used to travel to England and work at Ernest Rutherford's Cavendish Laboratory at Cambridge University. While there he continued his work developing the mass spectrograph, and became friends with the British physicist John Cockcroft.

When his Guggenheim fellowship expired in September 1934, he returned to the United States, where he accepted an associate professorship at Harvard University. He started by building a new mass spectrograph that he had designed with at the Cavendish Laboratory. Working with J. Curry Street, he commenced work on a cyclotron. They had a design for a  cyclotron provided by Ernest Lawrence, but decided to build a  cyclotron instead.
 
Bainbridge was elected a Fellow of the American Academy of Arts and Sciences in 1937. His interest in mass spectroscopy led naturally to an interest in the relative abundance of isotopes. The discovery of nuclear fission in uranium-235 led to an interest in separating this isotope. He proposed using a Holweck pump to produce the vacuum necessary for this work, and enlisted George B. Kistiakowsky and E. Bright Wilson to help. There was little interest in their work because research was being carried out elsewhere. In 1943, their cyclotron was requisitioned by Edwin McMillan for use by the U. S. Army. It was packed up and carted off to Los Alamos, New Mexico.

World War II
In September 1940, with World War II raging in Europe, the British Tizard Mission brought a number of new technologies to the United States, including a cavity magnetron, a high-powered device that generates microwaves using the interaction of a stream of electrons with a magnetic field. This device, which promised to revolutionize radar, demolished any thoughts the Americans had entertained about their technological leadership. Alfred Lee Loomis of the National Defense Research Committee established the Radiation Laboratory  at the Massachusetts Institute of Technology to develop this radar technology. In October, Bainbridge became one of the first scientists to be recruited for the Radiation Laboratory by Ernest Lawrence. The scientists divided up the work between them; Bainbridge drew pulse modulators. Working with the Navy, he helped develop high-powered radars for warships.

In May 1943, Bainbridge joined Robert Oppenheimer's Project Y at Los Alamos. He initially led E-2, the instrumentation group, which developed X-ray instrumentation for examining explosions. In March 1944, he became head of a new group, E-9, which was charged with conducting the first nuclear test. In Oppenheimer's sweeping reorganization of the Los Alamos laboratory in August 1944, the E-9 Group became X-2.

On July 16, 1945, Bainbridge and his colleagues conducted the Trinity nuclear test. "My personal nightmare," he later wrote, "was knowing that if the bomb didn't go off or hangfired, I, as head of the test, would have to go to the tower first and seek to find out what had gone wrong." To his relief, the explosion of the first atomic bomb went off without such drama, in what he later described as "a foul and awesome display". He turned to Oppenheimer and said, "Now we are all sons of bitches."

Bainbridge was relieved that the Trinity test had been a success, relating in a 1975 Bulletin of the Atomic Scientists article, "I had a feeling of exhilaration that the 'gadget' had gone off properly followed by one of deep relief. I wouldn't have to go to the tower to see what had gone wrong."

For his work on the Manhattan Project, Bainbridge received two letters of commendation from the project's director, Major General Leslie R. Groves, Jr.  He also received a Presidential Certificate of Merit for his work at the MIT Radiation Laboratory.

Postwar
Bainbridge returned to Harvard after the war, and initiated the construction of a  synchro-cyclotron, which has since been dismantled. From 1950 to 1954, he chaired the physics department at Harvard. During those years, he drew the ire of Senator Joseph McCarthy for his aggressive defense of his colleagues in academia. As chairman, he was responsible for the renovation of the old Jefferson Physical Laboratory, and he established the Morris Loeb Lectures in Physics. He also devoted a good deal of his time to improving the laboratory facilities for graduate students.

Throughout the 1950s, Bainbridge remained an outspoken proponent of civilian control of nuclear power and the abandonment of nuclear testing. In 1950 he was one of twelve prominent scientists who petitioned President Harry S. Truman to declare that the United States would never be the first to use the hydrogen bomb. Bainbridge retired from Harvard in 1975.

Bainbridge's wife Margaret died suddenly in January 1967 from a blood clot in a broken wrist. He married Helen Brinkley King, an editor at William Morrow in New York City, in October 1969. She died in February 1989. A scholarship was established at Sarah Lawrence College in her memory. He died at his home in Lexington, Massachusetts, on July 14, 1996. He was survived by his daughters from his first marriage, Joan Bainbridge Safford and Margaret Bainbridge Robinson. He was buried in the Abel's Hill Cemetery on Martha's Vineyard, in a plot with his first wife Margaret and his son Martin. His papers are in the Harvard University Archives.

In the 2023 film Oppenheimer, he is portrayed by Josh Peck.

See also
Bainbridge mass spectrometer

Notes

References

External links
Oral History interview transcript for Kenneth Bainbridge on 16 March 1977, American Institute of Physics, Niels Bohr Library and Archives - Session I
Oral History interview transcript for Kenneth Bainbridge on 23 March 1977, American Institute of Physics, Niels Bohr Library and Archives - Session II

1904 births
1996 deaths
American nuclear physicists
Fellows of the American Academy of Arts and Sciences
Harvard University faculty
Horace Mann School alumni
Manhattan Project people
Mass spectrometrists
MIT School of Engineering alumni
People from Cooperstown, New York
Princeton University alumni
Articles containing video clips
Scientists from New York (state)
Fellows of the American Physical Society